Major-General Khaled Nezzar (born 25 December 1937) is an Algerian general and former member of the High Council of State of Algeria. He was born in the douar of Thlet, in Seriana in the Batna region. His father, Rahal Nezzar, was a former non-commissioned officer in the French army who had turned to farming after World War II. His mother died in 1941.

Military career
After studying in the local native school (école indigène), he was transferred to a school for troops' children at Koléa, and then joined the French army, studying at the Strasbourg military school in Algiers where non-commissioned officers were trained. After independence in 1962, he remained in the Algerian army, and started rising through the ranks. He went to Moscow in 1964 to receive military training at the M. V. Frunze Military Academy. Upon his return in 1965, he was named Director of Materiel in the Ministry of National Defense. Soon after Houari Boumedienne's coup, he was put in charge of the Saharan 2nd Motorized Infantry, based around Ain Sefra.  In 1968, he was sent to Egypt to help guard the Egypt–Israel line of control, which at the time (just after the Six-Day War) witnessed regular artillery bombardments and aerial bombings. After returning from Egypt, he was put in charge of training Algeria's first parachutists, with Soviet help, at Biskra.

In 1975, he went through further training at the Ecole Supérieure de Guerre in Paris; at this point, he was a Lieutenant-Colonel. He returned in his second year without finishing his studies, having been summoned back to command troops in Tindouf at the height of the Moroccan-Algerian conflict over the Western Sahara issue. He spent the next seven years in the Bechar-Tindouf area.

After Chadli Bendjedid took power, Nezzar was sent away from Tindouf to the east, a decision which he resented.  He rose rapidly through the ranks, and, by 1988, he was a ground forces commander at Ain Naadja in Algiers, where he played a significant role in suppressing the "Black October" riots.

Political career
He became Minister of Defense in July 1990. In his memoirs, he recounts his hostility during this period to the interim prime minister Mouloud Hamrouche and president Chadli Bendjedid, whom he accuses of effectively "conniving" with the Islamic Salvation Front for the sake of increasing their power.

After the Islamic Salvation Front's electoral victory in 1991, he, along with Larbi Belkheir, was among the leading generals who decided to depose then-President Chadli Bendjedid and annul the elections, marking the beginning of the Algerian Civil War. He became a member of the new provisional governing body, the High Council of State (HCS), when it was established in January 1991. He survived an assassination attempt in February 1993 in El Biar (Algiers), and gave up his position five months later, when the HCS's mandate terminated. In 1999, he (unusual for an Algerian general) published his memoirs, written in French and translated into Arabic.

Personal life
In October 2001, Khaled Nezzar's son Lotfi violently attacked a Le Matin reporter, Sid Ahmed Semiane, for having criticized his father. He had already threatened him several times. Nezzar apologized for his son's actions three days later; his son was eventually found guilty in court, and paid a fine of 12 euros.

In 2002, Nezzar sued the dissident officer Habib Souaidia in Paris for defamation. Souaidia had accused him of "being responsible for the assassination of thousands of people", blaming him and other generals for starting the war and committing massacres attributed to the Armed Islamic Group.  As the trial began, nine Algerians in Paris filed complaints against Nezzar for torture and inhumane treatment; he left Paris before these could be evaluated, saying he did not want to risk a diplomatic incident.  The court found Souaidia innocent.

References

 Nezzar, Khaled. 1999. Mémoires du Général Khaled Nezzar, Chihab Editions.  .
 Proces K. Nezzar / H. Souaidia: Presse anglophone
 Algérie : le général-major Khaled Nezzar perd son procès en diffamation contre Habib Souaïdia, l’auteur de La Sale Guerre
 Nezzar, Khaled - biographie
 The National Court of Spain rejects the extradition of Klahed Nezzar to Algeria

1937 births
Living people
People from Batna Province
Chaoui people
Algerian military personnel
Politics of Algeria
Algerian generals
Frunze Military Academy alumni
Defense ministers of Algeria
Defectors from the French army to the ALN
21st-century Algerian people